Banshi Singh  (known as Banshi Singh Pahadiya) is an Indian politician and a member of the 16th Legislative Assembly of India. He represents the Khurja constituency of Uttar Pradesh and is a member of the Indian National Congress political party.

Early life and  education
Banshi Singh was  born in Gautam Budh Nagar district. He is educated till eighth grade. Singh belongs to the Khatik community.

Political career
Banshi Singh has been a MLA for one term. He represented the Khurja constituency and is a member of the Indian National Congress political party.

In 2019, he got Loksabha ticket by Indian National Congress from Bulandashahar (Lok Sabha constituency), he contested against Bhola Singh (Current MP of Bulandashahar). However he lost the election and came in third position with 29,465 votes followed by BJP's Bhola Singh won with 6,81,321 votes and BSP's Yogesh Verma with 3,91,264 votes on the second.

Posts held

See also

 Khurja (Assembly constituency)
 Sixteenth Legislative Assembly of Uttar Pradesh
 Uttar Pradesh Legislative Assembly

References 

Indian National Congress politicians
Uttar Pradesh MLAs 2012–2017
People from Gautam Buddh Nagar district
1962 births
Living people